Man'gyŏngdae-guyŏk or Man'gyŏngdae District is one of the 18 guyŏk (wards) that constitute P'yŏngyang, North Korea. It began as a village, Man'gyŏngdae-ri, South P'yŏngan Province and became a district of P'yŏngyang in September 1959. The area is surrounded by several hills, the highest one named Man'gyŏng Hill because one can enjoy a bird's-eye view of the surrounding scenic landscape, and the village at its foot is called Man'gyŏngdae. Man'gyŏngdae was the birthplace of North Korean leader Kim Il-sung.

Man'gyŏngdae-guyŏk extends to the west past the Sunhwa River, to Kangso-gun. Kwangbok Street is a residential district of high rise apartments populated by members of the DPRK media and cultural institutions.

Administrative divisions
Man'gyŏngdae-guyŏk is divided into 26 tong (neighbourhoods) and 2 ri (villages):

 Changhun 1-dong 장훈 1동 (獎訓 1洞)
 Changhun 2-dong 장훈 2동 (獎訓 2洞)
 Changhun 3-dong 장훈 3동 (獎訓 3洞)
 Ch'ilgol 1-dong 칠골 1동
 Ch'ilgol 2-dong 칠골 2동
 Ch'ilgol 3-dong 칠골 3동
 Ch'ukchŏn 1-dong 축전 1동 (祝典 1洞)
 Ch'ukchŏn 2-dong 축전 2동 (祝典 2洞)
 Kallimgil 1-dong 갈림길 1동
 Kallimgil 2-dong 갈림길 2동
 Kŏn'guk-tong 건국동 (建國洞)
 Kŭmch'ŏn-dong 금천동 (金泉洞)
 Kŭmsŏng 1-dong 금성 1동 (金星 1洞)
 Kŭmsŏng 2-dong 금성 2동 (金星 2洞)
 Kŭmsŏng 3-dong 금성 3동 (金星 3洞)
 Kwangbok-tong 광복동 (光復洞)
 Man'gyŏngdae-dong 만경대동 (萬景臺洞)
 P'algol 1-dong 팔골 1동
 P'algol 2-dong 팔골 2동
 Ryong'aksan-dong 룡악산동 (龍岳山洞)
 Ryongsan-dong 룡산동 (龍山洞)
 Samhŭng-dong 삼흥동 (三興洞)
 Sŏn'guja-dong 선구자동 (先驅者洞)
 Sŏnnae-dong 선내동 (仙內洞)
 Sŏsan-dong 서산동(西山洞)
 Taep'yŏng-dong 대평동 (大平洞)
 Tangsan 1-dong 당상 1동 (堂上 1洞)
 Tangsan 2-dong 당상 2동 (堂上 2洞)
 Ryongbong-ri 룡봉리 (龍峰里)
 Wŏllo-ri 원로리 (元魯里)

See also

Mangyongdae – historic neighborhood in Man'gyŏngdae-guyŏk
Mangyongdae Children's Palace
Mangyongdae Funfair
Mangyongdae Revolutionary School

References

Districts of Pyongyang